Moyne–Templetuohy Hurling and Football Club is a Gaelic Athletic Association club recruiting from the village of Templetuohy and the adjoining townland of Moyne, in County Tipperary, Ireland. It participates in the leagues and championships of the GAA's Mid Tipperary division, and in the county-wide competitions of Tipperary GAA. While several sports are played, hurling is predominant in the club. Dinny ‘the messer Moore is currently the biggest pipsqueak in the club

History
Shortly after the foundation of the GAA in 1884, separate clubs were formed in Moyne and Templetuohy. Moyne's hurlers defeated Tullaroan (of Kilkenny) in Johnstown by 2-2 to nil in the club's first known match in 1887. Templetuohy played Gortnahoe on the same day.

The clubs continued as separate entities for almost 50 years, with Templetuohy allying with Castleiney in the 1910s to play as 'Templetuohy and Castleiney United'. In 1936, however, a 'Moyne and Templetuohy' hurling club affiliated to Tipperary GAA along with a 'Templetuohy and Moyne' football club.

In 1938, the local GAA secured ownership of the long-established Gaelic games grounds from the owners of the Longorchard estate. A new club, Moyne–St Albert's, had a brief existence in the parish in the 1950s.

In 1991 the club began a new phase with the amalgamation of the separate hurling and football clubs in the parish. The present name was adopted, with Longorchard as the grounds. In 1999 a new clubhouse was opened, and a second pitch.

The club is involved in Scór.

Hurling
In 1914 Templetuohy and Castleiney United won the Mid and County Championships. Moyne recorded their first championship success in the Mid Junior Hurling Championship of 1917. In 1918, they defeated Ileigh in the Intermediate final.

In 1936 the newly-amalgamated Moyne and Templetuohy club lost the Mid Tipperary Senior Hurling final to Thurles Sarsfields. In the 1940s the club reached two Mid hurling finals.

Moyne recorded its first senior championship defeat of then-dominant Thurles Sarsfields in the Mid semi-final of 1966. In 1970 Moyne–Templetuohy won the Mid-Tipperary Senior Hurling Championship for the first time. The club went on to win its only county Senior Hurling title to date in 1971, with a 2-8 to 0-6 victory over Roscrea. The club won the Mid Senior Hurling Championship in 1976 and 1977, and the county Intermediate Championship in 1983.

Honours
 Tipperary Senior Hurling Championship (1)
1971
 Tipperary Intermediate Hurling Championship (3)
1983, 2014, 2021
 Mid Tipperary Senior Hurling Championship (4)
 1970, 1972, 1976, 1977
 Mid Tipperary Intermediate Hurling Championship (5)
 1982, 1983, 2001, 2002, 2004, 2019
 Tipperary Junior A Hurling Championship (3)
 1961, 1965, 1990
 Mid Tipperary Junior A Hurling Championship (7)
 1917 (as Moyne), 1923 (as Templetuohy), 1930 (as Moyne), 1961, 1965, 2010, 2015
 Tipperary Junior B Hurling Championship (2)
 2001, 2008
 Mid Tipperary Junior B Hurling Championship (2)
 2001, 2008
 Mid Tipperary Under-21 A Hurling Championship (4)
 1965, 1973, 1975, 1985 (as Moyne-Gortnahoe)
 Tipperary Under-21 B Hurling Championship (2)
 2011 (as Moyne–Templetuohy Og), 2013 (as Moyne–Templetuohy Og)
 Mid Tipperary Under-21 B Hurling Championship (5)
 2001, 2003, 2010, 2011 (as Moyne–Templetuohy Og), 2013 (as Moyne–Templetuohy Og) 2018, 
 Tipperary Minor A Hurling Championship (1)
 1964
 Mid Tipperary Minor A Hurling Championship (3)
 1964, 1965, 1966
 Tipperary Minor B Hurling Championship (2)
 1987, 2009 (as Moyne–Templetuohy Og)
 Mid Tipperary Minor B HurlingChampionship (2)
 1987, 2009 (as Moyne–Templetuohy Og) 2017 (Moyne Templetuohy Gaels)
 Mid Tipperary u21 B football
 2019

Notable players
 Hugh Coghlan, Tipperary senior footballer, 2006– 
 John Coghlan – Tipperary player at Minor, U-21 and Senior levels, 2007–
 Mick Cowan
 Jim Fogarty
 Tom Fogarty – Tipperary player (1960s–70s), later Tipperary and Offaly hurling manager
 Tomás Hamill – All-Ireland Senior Hurling winner 2016
 Paul Maher – All-Ireland Minor Hurling winner 2012, All-Ireland Senior Hurling winner 2019
 Elias O'Keeffe – the first Templetuohy player to join a Tipperary team when he was selected by county champions, Toomevara (1913)

Gaelic football

Templetuohy won the Mid Tipperary Senior Football Championship in 1911 and 1912, but lost the 1911 county championship final to Nenagh. An amalgamated Castleiney-Templetuohy team lost the 1915 final, again to Nenagh.

In the 1940s the club contested four Mid Senior Football Championship finals. After winning the Mid in 1949, Templetuohy met Galtee Rovers in the county final. Although Galtee Rovers won the match, the title was awarded to Templetuohy due to irregularities with the Rovers team. In 1950, Templetuohy retained the Mid title.

In 1980 Templetuohy won the Tipperary Junior Football Championship, defeating Arravale Rovers in the final. Promotion to the Intermediate ranks was immediately rewarded with a Championship title in 1981. The club next won the Mid Senior Championship in 1986 and 2001, defeating Loughmore–Castleiney on both occasions. The clubs met again in the 2007 and 2008 finals, both won by Loughmore–Castleiney.

Honours
 Tipperary Senior Football Championship (1)
 1949(as Templetuohy)
 Tipperary Intermediate Football Championship (3)
 1981, 2005, 2018
 Mid Tipperary Senior Football Championship (6)
 1911 (as Templetuohy), 1912 (as Templetuohy), 1949 (as Templetuohy), 1950, 1986, 2001
 Mid Tipperary Intermediate Football Championship (7)
 1981, 1982 (as Templetuohy), 1995, 1996, 2004, 2005, 2016
 Mid Tipperary Junior A Football Championship (12)
 1936 (as Templetuohy), 1940 (as Templetuohy), 1941 (as Templetuohy), 1942 (as Templetuohy), 1952 (as Templetuohy), 1964, 1965, 1971, 1973, 1974, 1977, 1980
Mid Tipperary Junior B Football Championship 2018
 Mid Tipperary Under-21 A Football Championship (9)
 1967, 1968, 1973, 1975, 1983, 2000, 2001, 2002, 2003
 Tipperary Under-21 B Football Championship (1)
 1996
 Mid Tipperary Under-21 B Football Championship (2)
 1990, 1996
 Mid Tipperary Minor A Football Championship (1)
 1996
 Tipperary Minor B Football Championship (1) 
 2005 
 Mid Tipperary Minor B Football Championship (4)
 1994, 2005, 2008, 2010 
2017 (Moyne Templetuohy Gaels)

Note - in some cases the team is shown as Templetuohy–Moyne in football competitions.

Ladies' Gaelic football
The club a Ladies' Football section, fielding several girls' teams.

References

External links 
Official Site
Tipperary GAA site
GAA Info Page

Gaelic games clubs in County Tipperary
Gaelic football clubs in County Tipperary
Hurling clubs in County Tipperary